The Herefordshire and Gloucestershire Canal (sometimes known as the Hereford and Gloucester Canal) is a canal in the west of England, which ran from Hereford to Gloucester, where it linked to the River Severn. It was opened in two phases in 1798 and 1845, and closed in 1881, when the southern section was used for the course of the Ledbury and Gloucester Railway. It is the subject of an active restoration scheme.

History
The first plans for a canal between Hereford and Gloucester were made by Robert Whitworth, one of James Brindley's pupils, in 1777. The route was part of a grander plan to link Stourport on Severn and Leominster as well. Twelve years later, Richard Hall submitted plans for a canal via Ledbury. In March 1790, the promoters decided to submit the plans to Parliament. Josiah Clowes, an engineer who had previous experience of working on the Chester Canal and who had worked with Whitworth on the Thames and Severn Canal, was to be the engineer. It appears that he re-surveyed the route, and recommended a change, so that it passed through Ledbury. A branch would be built to Newent where there were minor coalfields, and the canal would be suitable for boats , capable of carrying 35 tons. The estimated cost was £70,000, and it was expected to carry 33,203 tons per year, generating £9,582 in revenue. Some of the promoters began to think that improving the River Wye might be a better option, but the announcement of new seams of coal at Newent resulted in a decision to obtain an Act of Parliament, which was granted in April 1791.

Hugh Henshall, who was the brother-in-law of James Brindley, was asked to re-survey the route in 1792, and recommended a diversion to Newent. This route required a tunnel at Oxenhall, and another act of parliament was obtained in 1793 to sanction the new route. Josiah Clowes died in 1795, and was succeeded as engineer by Robert Whitworth. By late 1795, the initial section was open to Newent, but the tunnel was causing major problems.

In order to build the tunnel, twenty shafts were sunk along its route, so that there could be multiple working faces. However, there were considerable difficulties caused by the volume of water entering the shafts. Horse-powered pumps proved inadequate, and eventually steam-powered pumps were employed, but this added to the cost, and the tunnel was a large factor in the failure to complete the canal.

The canal was opened to within one mile of Ledbury in 1798, but stopped there as the cost had far exceeded the estimates. The Coal Branch to the mines at Newent was never a success, as the coal was of very poor quality, and the branch fell into disuse very quickly. The price of coal in the region dropped from 24 shillings (£1.20) per ton to 13/6 (68p) but the coal was a good quality product which travelled up the canal from the River Severn. Ledbury remained the terminus for another forty years, although a short extension to enable coal to be delivered to the Ledbury gas works was completed in 1832.

Second phase
In 1827, Stephen Ballard became the new clerk of the company, and produced a report on how to complete the canal in 1829. In 1838, he proposed a new route for the final section, but the engineer James Walker advised against it, and so in May 1839, a new Act of Parliament was obtained, allowing the company to raise the money to complete the canal. Work started on 17 November. A feeder from the River Frome to the summit level was completed in August 1842, and the canal opened in stages as it was completed, with extensions to Canon Frome wharf in January 1843, Whithington wharf in February 1844, and finally to Hereford basin on 22 May 1845.

Again, costs escalated well beyond the original estimates.

Operation
The canal had cost far more to build than was originally planned. The whole canal had been estimated at £69,997 by Josiah Clowes in 1790, but the section to Ledbury had cost in excess of £104,000. Stephen Ballard had estimated the cost of the second phase at £53,000, but the final cost had been £141,436. With little increase in trade from the longer canal, the company tried to sell it to a railway company almost immediately, but were unsuccessful, and so tried to boost trade.

Traffic started to increase, to the extent that a timetable for the transit of the Oxenhall tunnel had to be introduced in 1849. This was not always successful, as the Hereford Times carried articles in May 1851 about an incident in which boats travelling in opposite directions had met in the middle, and neither would give way. There was deadlock for a period of 58 hours.

Decline and Closure
In 1858, the canal carried 47,560 tons of goods, and generated an income of £7,061 in 1860, but some of this was derived from the carriage of materials to build railways in the area. On 17 January 1862, less than 17 years after the opening to Hereford, the canal was leased to the Great Western and West Midland Railway, with a view to converting it to a railway. This did not take place immediately, but on 30 June 1881, half of the canal was closed, and sections of it were used for the course of the Ledbury and Gloucester Railway. The Hereford to Ledbury section remained open, but gradually became disused. The Canal Company continued to receive rent from the Great Western Railway, which it distributed to its shareholders as dividends, and was not formally wound up until the railways were nationalised in 1948.

Route

The first  from Hereford to Withington, which includes the Aylestone tunnel, was level, after which the canal rose by  through three locks over the three miles to Monkhide. This section includes the skew bridge at Monkhide, built by Ballard at an angle of only 27° to the canal.
 The bridge was constructed of red brick with some stone dressing, and the parapets are capped with large black engineering bricks which indicate that they were made by B W Blades of West Bromwich. The bridge is a grade II listed structure. There is then another level section of more than twelve miles to the outskirts of Ledbury, which includes the Ashperton tunnel. Water is fed into this section from the River Frome. The coal branch left the canal below the tunnel. The canal had 22 locks, and three tunnels. Like many English canals it was built to carry valuable cargoes by narrowboats.

Restoration
A series of articles about the canal were published in the local press in early 1983, and this led to calls for a society to be formed which would raise public awareness of the canal. A meeting was held in Hereford to facilitate this on 13 April 1983, at which a canal society was formed, which soon became actively engaged in restoration.

Since 1991 the local council authorities in Herefordshire have set aside land for development as a canal route.  The planning department has approved projects with the canal in mind, and has taken action against those trying to build on the proposed route of the canal. Similar support has been given by the local council authorities in Gloucestershire.

In 2000, the Over Canal Basin (adjacent to the River Severn at Over on the outskirts of Gloucester, where the Canal links with the inland waterways network) was reconstructed entirely by volunteers from the Canal Trust and the national volunteer body the Waterway Recovery Group. The estimated commercial cost of the work was some £500,000, but it was completed against a 10-month deadline, with a budget of just £60,000. The basin was originally filled in when the Over Isolation Hospital was built in 1903. The site was sold for housing development to Swan Homes, and agreement was reached to excavate the basin to enhance the project, under which Wharf House was rebuilt to provide a new canal centre. In late 2011, the Trust were able to buy a short section of the former canal route adjacent to the basin site (Vineyard Hill). This had been purchased by residents in 2004 to protect their communal interests, and was passed to the Trust for a nominal sum. Like the basin, there was a deadline on development, which had to be completed by September 2012, but a major effort by the Waterway Recovery Group and members of the Trust resulted in most of the work being completed in April 2012. It was re-watered by 18 April, four months before its scheduled completion date.  It was formally re-opened by Timothy West and Prunella Scales at the 2012 Over Canal Festival.

Major re-development in Hereford city centre has resulted in the provision for  a new canal bed which it is hoped will eventually link to a new terminal basin. Further development has also taken place on the Aylestone Park section, after the removal of silt containing heavy metals. Following partial restoration, which saw the Trust working on the park, and Herefordshire Council, owners of the park, working on the canal, a short section at Aylestone was used for a boat rally in May 2011. A slipway enabled the boats to be launched, and the canal will be made wider in due course.

The canal connects to an un-navigable part of the River Severn, separated from the main channel by weirs at Maisemore and Llanthony, both of which have derelict locks associated with them. Maisemore was sold by British Waterways some years ago, and they decided to dispose of Llanthony in 2007. The Canal Trust used a legacy to purchase the site, which includes two cottages, some land, and a small section of the River Severn as well as Llanthony lock. The lock is bigger than that at Maisemore, and access to the entrance lock at Over is easier because boats are travelling against the flow of the river as they approach it.

At Newent, Bridge Street crossed over the canal on a bridge. When the railway replaced the canal, they constructed a high level bridge over the road, which was lowered to accommodate this solution. The Canal Trust envisaged that the canal could be rebuilt between the platforms of Newent railway station, but this would have involved the construction of large embankments, which were thought to be out of scale with the environment. In 2019, they therefore reconsidered what options were possible, and proposed the use of an inclined plane, using a cradle running on rails to raise boats from the canal level up to the station, with a level section between the platforms, followed by another incline to reach the height required to cross the road and another incline to return boats to the level of the canal on the other side.

Visitor Centre
The Wharf House at Over Basin is a restored lock cottage that, until 2019, served as a visitor centre and restaurant. From its inception in 2005 until 2019, the Wharf House was operated by the Herefordshire & Gloucestershire Canal Trust, with profits donated to the H&G Canal Trust Charity. In 2019, management of the Wharf House was turned over to a private firm, and the restaurant was renamed The Lock Keepers.

See also

Canals of the United Kingdom
History of the British canal system

Bibliography

References

External links

Herefordshire & Gloucestershire Canal Trust
Herefordshire & Gloucestershire Canal on SoGlos.com

Canals in England
Canals linked to the River Severn
Canals in Gloucestershire
Canals in Herefordshire
Canals opened in 1798
Canals opened in 1845